Andrea Hlaváčková and Lucie Hradecká were the defending champions, but chose not to participate together.  Hlaváčková played alongside Zheng Jie, but lost in the quarterfinals to Kimiko Date-Krumm and Barbora Záhlavová-Strýcová. Hradecká teamed up with Michaëlla Krajicek, but lost in the third round to Zarina Diyas and Xu Yifan.
Ekaterina Makarova and Elena Vesnina won their second Grand Slam doubles title together, defeating Martina Hingis and Flavia Pennetta in the final, 2–6, 6–3, 6–2.

Seeds

Draw

Finals

Top half

Section 1

Section 2

Bottom half

Section 3

Section 4

References

External links
Draw
2014 US Open – Women's draws and results at the International Tennis Federation

Women's Doubles
US Open - Women's Doubles
US Open (tennis) by year – Women's doubles
2014 in women's tennis
2014 in American women's sports